"Ego Trippin′" is a 1986 song by Ultramagnetic MCs. The group made a stylistic breakthrough with it; the song boasted dense, minimalist production, featuring erratic lyricism by Ced-Gee and Kool Keith, synthesizer riffs and was the first song to sample Melvin Bliss's "Synthetic Substitution", now one of the most sampled songs of all time.

Lyricism
The Anthology of Rap, published by Yale University Press, makes note of such pseudoscientific terminology in Ced-Gee's lyricism on "Ego Trippin'", particularly the lines "Usin' frequencies and data, I am approximate / Leaving revolutions turning, emerging chemistry / With the precise implications, achieved adversively". Kool Keith's rhymes are manic and expressed in a staccato pace. His lyrics on "Ego Trippin'" also criticize the musical aesthetic of old school hip hop artists at the time: "They use the simple back and forth, the same old rhythm / That a baby can pick up and join right with them / But their rhymes are pathetic, they think they copasetic / Using nursery terms, at least not poetic".

Use in popular culture
In 1994, De La Soul paid tribute to it by calling their single Ego Trippin' (Part Two), which charted at #47 on the Hot Dance Music/Maxi-Singles Sales, #74 on the Billboard Hot R&B/Hip-Hop Songs chart and #39 on the Hot Rap Singles.
Ego Trippin' was also paid tribute to by Sway & King Tech on their album This or That, as there was a song on it called "Ego Trippin' '99" which featured Kool Keith and Motion Man.
"Why R U" by Amerie from the album In Love & War samples this song.
Was featured in the soundtrack for the Video game Tony Hawk's Underground 2.

References

1986 singles
1986 songs